This is a partial list of International Brigades personnel in the Spanish Civil War'The brigades were military units set up by the Communist International consisting of foreign volunteers to the Republican cause. It is estimated that during the entire war, between 40,000 and 59,000 members served in the International Brigades, including 15,000 who died in combat.Thomas, Hugh. (2003) The Spanish Civil War, 2003. London: Penguin (Revised 4th edition), 2003.  pp. 941–945;
Not all foreign volunteers served in the Brigades, those who were anti-Stalinist such as George Orwell joined other Republican units.

 A 
William Aalto - Joined Abraham Lincoln Brigade in 1937. Fought at Battle of Teruel and in special operations.
Anton Ackermann - Leader of the Political School of the International Brigades. 
Madge Addy - Nurse with the International Brigades.
Bill Alexander - Political commissar of British Anti-Tank Battery, British Battalion. Became commander of British Battalion in December 1937 Took part in the Battle of Belchite (1937) and was promoted to captain after the Battle of Teruel.
Celestino Alfonso - Machine-gunner and political commissar.
Todor Angelov - Served in Dimitrov Battalion.
Akseli Anttila
Alberto Assa
Shimon Avidan

 B 
Shapour Bakhtiar
Ralph Bates - Swindon, England. Founded the XV International Brigade's newspaper, The Volunteer for Liberty''.
Hans Beimler
Delmer Berg
Alvah Bessie
Norman Bethune
Len Beurton
Geoffrey Bing
Milan Blagojević Španac
Joseph Boczov
Petre Borilă
Herman Bottcher
John Edward Boulting
Willy Brandt
Clive Branson
Willi Bredel
Moisès Broggi
George Brown - Killed at Villanueva de la Cañada in the Battle of Brunete, 6 July 1937.
Felicia Browne - Killed in Aragon, 28 August 1936.
Kurt Bürger
Ernst Busch

C
Edward A. Carter Jr. - American. Abraham Lincoln Brigade
Christopher Caudwell
Alfred Chakin
Kazimierz Cichowski
Lewis Clive - Killed at Hill 481, in the Siege of Gandesa, 1 August 1938.
Claud Cockburn - Daily Worker correspondent for the Spanish Civil War.
Archie Cochrane
Milan Ćopić
Fred Copeman
Vladimir Ćopić
John Cornford - Cambridge, England. Killed in the Battle of Lopera, 28 December 1936.
Nicolae Cristea
David Crook
Nigel Cullen
Jock Cunningham

D
Peter Daly - Enniscorthy, Ireland. Wounded at the Battle of Belchite, died in hospital, 6 September 1937.
Georgi Damyanov
Peko Dapčević
Carmelo Delgado Delgado - Puerto Rico
Charlie Donnelly - Dungannon, Northern Ireland. Killed in the Battle of Jarama, 27 February 1937.
Jules Dumont

F
Ralph Winston Fox - Yorkshire, England. Died in service, 28 December 1936.

G
János Gálicz
Ermenegildo Gasperoni
Pierre Georges
Irving Goff
David Guest

H
Robert Hilliard - Killarney, Ireland. Died in service, February 1937.
Otakar Hromádko

J
Fernanda Jacobsen
Jack Jones
James Robertson Justice
Žikica Jovanović Španac

K
Hans Kahle
Salaria Kea - USA
Ali Kelmendi - Kosova/Albania. Garibaldi International Brigade.
Peter Kerrigan
Bernard Knox
František Kriegel
Dušan Kveder

L
Arthur H. Landis
Jef Last
Oliver Law
Laurie Lee
Tuure Lehén
Maurice Levitas - Dublin, Ireland.
Yank Levy
Luigi Longo
Karlo Lukanov

M
Petro Marko
André Marty
Carl Marzani - Rome, Italy.
Matti Mattson
Robert Hale Merriman
Erich Mielke
Ewart Milne - Dublin, Ireland. Ambulance driver.
Ferenc Münnich - Hungary. Rakosi Battalion, political commissar

N
Conlon Nancarrow
George Nathan
Steve Nelson
Pietro Nenni
Guido Nonveiller

O
Paddy O'Daire - County Donegal, Ireland.
Abraham Osheroff

P
Randolfo Pacciardi
Jules Paivio
Ezekias Papaioannou
Wogan Philipps  - United Kingdom. Ambulance driver and logistics financier of the International Brigades.

R
László Rajk - Hungary. Rakosi Battalion, political commissar
Pramod Ranjan Sengupta
Heinrich Rau
Gustav Regler
Ludwig Renn
Edwin Rolfe
Henri Rol-Tanguy
Valter Roman
Esmond Romilly
Franc Rozman
Frank Ryan - County Limerick, Ireland.

S
Elman Service
Thora Silverthorne - Abertillery, Wales. Chief nurse of the first foreign hospital created in Spain to aid the International Brigades.
Humphrey (Hugh) Slater
John Sommerfield
Manfred Stern
Karol Świerczewski

V
Asim Vokshi

W
Alec Wainman- Yorkshire, England. Ambulance driver and propagandist for the Second Spanish Republic.
Tom Wintringham - Grimsby, Lincolnshire. Commander of the British Battalion of the International Brigades.
Milton Wolff

Z
Wilhelm Zaisser
Máté Zalka
Frank Zamora - Abercraf, Wales. Killed in the Battle of Teruel, 20 January 1938.

References